Albert Dauchez was a French archer. He competed at the 1908 Summer Olympics in London. Dauchez entered the men's double York round event in 1908, taking 23rd place with 280 points. He then competed in the Continental style contest, placing 6th at 222 points.

References

External links
 
 

Year of birth missing
Year of death missing
Archers at the 1908 Summer Olympics
Olympic archers of France
French male archers